The 1959 All-Southwest Conference football team consists of American football players chosen by various organizations for All-Southwest Conference teams for the 1959 NCAA University Division football season.  The selectors for the 1959 season included the Associated Press (AP) and the United Press (UP).  Players selected as first-team players by both the AP and UP are designated in bold.

All Southwest selections

Backs
 Don Meredith, SMU (AP-1; UPI-1)
 Jack Spikes, TCU (AP-1; UPI-1)
 Jim Mooty, Arkansas (AP-1; UPI-1)
 Rene Ramirez, Texas (AP-1)
 Jack Collins, Texas (UPI-1)

Ends
 Monte Lee, Texas (AP-1; UPI-1)
 Albert Witcher, Baylor (AP-1)
 Henry Christopher, SMU (UPI-1)

Tackles
 Don Floyd, TCU (AP-1; UPI-1)
 Bob Lilly, TCU (AP-1; UPI-1)

Guards
 Maurice Doke, Texas (AP-1; UPI-1)
 Rufus King, Rice (AP-1; UPI-1)

Centers
 Wayne Harris, Arkansas (AP-1; UPI-1)

Key
AP = Associated Press

UPI = United Press International

Bold = Consensus first-team selection of both the AP and UP

See also
1959 College Football All-America Team

References

All-Southwest Conference
All-Southwest Conference football teams